The fifth and final season of Undercover premiered on BNT 1 on March 20 and ended on June 6, 2016.

Plot
Martin was promoted to the chief of the department and met with Popov's Erol Metin. The Hook had been in prison, but with Ivo's help he was released. Popov is in prison and Nia was visited by The Lizard's brother and got raked.

Cast

Main
 Boyko Krastanov as Erol Metin
 Zahary Baharov as Ivo Andonov
 Ivaylo Zahariev as Martin Hristov
 Vladimir Penev as Inspector Emil Popov
 Yoanna Temelkova as Nia Tudzharova
 Marian Valev as Rosen Gatzov - The Hook

Guest
 Kiril Efremov as Tihomir Gardev - Tisho the Twin (episodes 1-5, 7-12)

Episodes

External links 
 

Bulgarian television series
2011 Bulgarian television series debuts
2010s Bulgarian television series
2016 Bulgarian television series endings